Badlapur Boys is a 2014 Hindi-language sports drama film directed by Shailesh Verma and produced by A. Muthu and Salim Tanwar. It stars Nishan, Saranya Mohan, Annu Kapoor and Puja Gupta in lead roles. Ankit (Saurabh) Sharma Played the character of Deenu in this film. The film is about a team of Kabaddi players in a family romantic drama with sports as a backdrop. It is a remake of the Tamil hit film Vennila Kabadi Kuzhu. Bollywood editor A. Muthu, who has edited more than 50 films (including Sadak, Deewana, Balwan, Raja Babu, Judwa, Ziddi, Haseena Maan Jayegi), took the remake rights of Tamil film Vennila Kabadi Kuzhu and produced this film.

Cast
 Nishan as Vijay
 Sushant Kandya as Rajkumar
 Saranya Mohan as Sapna
 Ankit (Sourabh) Sharma as Deenu
 Annu Kapoor as Surajbhan Singh 
 Puja Gupta as Manjari
 Anupam Maanav as Dr. O.P Malhotra
 Kishori Shahane
 Aman Verma
 Preet Saluja as Sajid
 Boloram Das as Sadhu

Synopsis

The story centres on Vijay, a child whose village has been long deprived of water for irrigation. Vijay's father threatens the bureaucracy with self-immolation if the village's basic need for water is not fulfilled. To set an example, the father sets himself ablaze before the villagers and the media. As fate would have it, his sacrifice is forgotten and instead his family is affected. Vijay grows up with the dream that  one day, he will come face to face with the bureaucracy with a simple request; that his village 'Badlapur' receives government's attention to solve their water crisis. Vijay then performs in a kabaddi competition in hopes of making a change, but punctures his rib and dies, but wins the competition. His coach then bring this fact in public and the government finally agrees to these demands and the village have water for irrigation once again.

Soundtrack

Box office
Badlapur Boys opened with 16 lakhs box office earnings on its opening day. The first weekend box office of the movie was approximately 43 lakhs INR. The lifetime revenues from this movie was 89 lakhs INR. Although the movie did not face tough competition, the film still was not able to garner much success.

References

External links 
 
 
 Badlapur Boys - The Times of India

2014 films
2010s Hindi-language films
2010s sports drama films
Hindi remakes of Tamil films
Indian sports drama films
Sports films based on actual events
Films scored by Shamir Tandon
2014 drama films
Kabaddi in India
Films set in Maharashtra
Films shot in Jaipur